Andrew John Hodd (born 12 January 1984) is a former English cricketer. He is a right-handed batsman and wicket-keeper, who ended his career playing for Yorkshire. He was born in Chichester.

He made his debut for Sussex in 2003, but moved to Surrey for two years to increase his playing chances. In 2006 he returned to Sussex.

Hodd has represented the English Under-19 cricket team.

In August 2012, Hodd was signed on loan by Yorkshire, to cover for Jonny Bairstow's regular absences with the England cricket team. At the end of the season, the move became permanent with Hodd signing a two-year deal with the club.

Career best performances
as of 13 May 2021

References

External links
 

1984 births
Living people
Surrey cricketers
Sussex cricketers
Yorkshire cricketers
Sportspeople from Chichester
Sussex Cricket Board cricketers
English cricketers
Wicket-keepers